The Thessaly gudgeon (Gobio feraeensis) is a species of gudgeon, a small freshwater in the family Cyprinidae. It is found in the Pineios and Karla Lake drainages in Greece.

References

 

Gobio
Fish described in 1973
Taxa named by Alexander I. Stephanidis